textClipping is an extension used by Macintosh computers for strings of text since Mac OS 9. When a string of text is selected and dragged to the desktop or anywhere on a Macintosh computer, the computer automatically converts it into a .textClipping file. The file formed can conveniently be dragged to any text box to replicate the exact text, including its formatting.

Because of its legacy origins, the contents of textClipping files are not stored inside the actual data "fork" of the file, and the files cannot easily be shared between Macs or sent to other machines like an attachment. Opening the textClipping file in most applications will show a 0 byte empty data file. When macOS views or performs an action on a textClipping file, it performs a lookup of the file's resource fork where the contents are actually stored.

Unlike most file extensions, .textClipping separates the words in its name using capitalization (called Camel case), a practice commonly used in many programming languages.

References

MacOS